The men's team foil was one of seven fencing events on the fencing at the 1932 Summer Olympics programme. It was the fifth appearance of the event. The competition was held from 31 July 1932 to 1 August 1932. 30 fencers from 6 nations competed. Each team could have a maximum of six fencers, with four participating in any given match. Belgium and Cuba entered, but withdrew before competition.

The competition format continued the pool play round-robin from prior years. Each of the four fencers from one team would face each of the four from the other, for a total of 16 bouts per match. The team that won more bouts won the match. Pool matches unnecessary to the result were not played (both pools resulted in one team losing both of the first two matches, so the matches between the winners were not necessary and were not played).

Rosters

Argentina
 Raúl Saucedo
 Roberto Larraz
 Rodolfo Valenzuela
 Ángel Gorordo

Denmark
 Axel Bloch
 Aage Leidersdorff
 Erik Kofoed-Hansen
 Ivan Osiier

France
 Edward Gardère
 René Lemoine
 René Bondoux
 René Bougnol
 Philippe Cattiau
 Jean Piot

Italy
 Giulio Gaudini
 Gioacchino Guaragna
 Gustavo Marzi
 Ugo Pignotti
 Rodolfo Terlizzi
 Giorgio Pessina

Mexico
 Raymundo Izcoa
 Leobardo Candiani
 Eduardo Prieto
 Jesús Sánchez

United States
 George Calnan
 Joe Levis
 Dernell Every
 Hugh Alessandroni
 Frank Righeimer
 Richard Steere

Results

Round 1

The top two teams in each pool advanced to the final. Cuba and Belgium both withdrew, leaving both pools with only three teams each.

Pool 1

Pool 2

Final

With three teams tied at 2–1, a fence-off barrage was required.

Barrage

The United States, which had defeated France 8–8 (54–60) in the final round, lost to France 11–5 in the barrage. The other results (Italy defeating the United States, France defeating Italy) were repeated. The Italy-France matches in both the final and barrage were 8–8 and decided on touches.

References

Foil team
Men's events at the 1932 Summer Olympics